Corus may refer to:

Places
Çörüş, Gazipaşa, a village in Antalya Province, Turkey

Facilities and structures
 Corus Quay, Toronto, Ontario, Canada; an office tower

Fictional locations
 Corus, a fictional world that is the setting for the fantasy series The Corean Chronicles by L. E. Modesitt, Jr.

People

Mythological characters
 Corus or Caurus, one of the Anemoi and the Roman god of the northwest wind
Corus (mythology), in Greek mythology the spirit and personification of surfeit and disdain

Events
 Battle of Corus (281 BC)

Companies
Corus Group plc, UK/Netherlands steel company
 Corus Bankshares, a financial holding group
 Corus Entertainment, a Canadian entertainment company
 Corus Québec (formerly Radiomédia), a news-talk radio network
Corus Hotels, hotel chain

Sport
 Corus chess tournament, former name for the Tata Steel Chess Tournament held in the Netherlands
Corus (Port Talbot) RFC, former name of Welsh rugby football club Tata Steel RFC
Corus Steel FC, former name of Welsh football club Tata Steel F.C.

Biology
 Corus (beetle), a genus of beetles in the longhorn family Cerambycidae
 Miletus croton corus (M. c. corus), a subspecies of butterfly
 Papilio corus (P. corus) or Euploea phaenareta corus (E. p. corus), a former species now subspecies of butterfly

Other uses
Corus, a fictional automobile manufacturer featured in Cross Racing Championship 2005, L.A. Street Racing and Project Torque, all of which are games developed by Invictus Games.
CÓRus, Irish choir

See also

Barker v Corus (UK) plc (2006) a UK House of Lords decision on industrial liability in tort law

Coordination of United Revolutionary Organizations (CORU) a U.S.-sponsored Cuban counter-revolutionary anti-communist force
Chorus (disambiguation)
Korus (disambiguation)